John Dwight (August 1, 1819 – November 25, 1903) was an American manufacturer and businessman. He was a pioneer manufacturer of bicarbonate of soda in the United States. The product had a variety of uses and sold nationwide in quantities resulting in a multi-million dollar industry. He was known in the merchandising industry for selling cleaning and baking products to grocery stores and supply vendors under the Cow Brand trademark.

Dwight was a philanthropist and involved with agricultural interests, schools, colleges, and church organizations. He helped develop public projects and built museums and libraries across the United States. He was a director and trustee in trade and transportation enterprises.

Early life and education 

Dwight was born in South Hadley, Massachusetts on August 1, 1819. His father was a medical doctor in the state of Connecticut. His mother was Lydia (White) Dwight, daughter of Captain William White, an officer in the Continental Army. Dwight's grandfather was Nathaniel Dwight of Belchertown, Massachusetts. Nathaniel, a captain in the French and Indian war, and his wife, Hannah Lyman were the parents of Elihu Dwight (Dwight's father). His great-grandfather was one of the founders of Dedham, Massachusetts – an Englishman by the name of John Dwight who had immigrated to America before 1635.

Dwight attended high school at Hopkins Academy in Hadley, Massachusetts. He was in the same class as Bishop Frederic Dan Huntington. Just before graduating from the school he received an appointment to West Point. He declined it and decided to enter into the business world instead.

Mid life and career 

Dwight moved to New York City in 1846 with his brother-in-law Austin Church. In 1847 the two entered into a partnership for the manufacture of bicarbonate of soda under the firm name of John Dwight & Company. Church was the first in the United States to devise a method of manufacturing sodium bicarbonate as an item that could be sold. Prior to this, the baking and medical product could only be bought from England as an expensive product.

Dwight and Church sold the powder product in red paper bags under the Cow Brand trademark. The firm had traveling sales agents that promoted the product. Dwight and Church packaged the product this way for hygiene and personally filled the bags. The paper bags were intentionally made in that packaging style and colorful bags to promote sales. Their competitors sold dry goods in open unhygienic kegs.

Church adopted the Arm & Hammer trademark from the Vulcan Spice Mills company that was owned by one of his sons and used it to sell baking soda (one of the uses for bicarbonate of soda). It was the same product that Cow Brand was selling as a common baked goods ingredient, especially for use in making breads and biscuits involving milk or buttermilk. Dwight continued marketing and selling the original baking product under his Cow Brand trademark and in a similar packaging style as Arm & Hammer baking soda. Arm & Hammer baking soda dominated the market in the United States from 1873, while Cow Brand was preferred in only a few places. Both sold their product nationally by the ton for other uses, including as a cleaning ingredient, health product agent, toothpaste component, and animal feed supplement. The two firms united in 1896 into Church & Dwight Company corporation.

Organizations 
Dwight was interested in several other enterprises and was a director of the New York board of trade and transportation for many years. He was also a trustee of the American Seamen's Friend Society for 30 years. Dwight was involved with the Hampton Institute of Hampton, Virginia, and founded the Dwight School in Erwin, Tennessee, for the education of poor children. He was a benefactor of the Hampton Normal and Agricultural Institute and gave the Art Memorial Building to Mount Holyoke College in 1900. The Art Memorial Building was on the location where Dwight was born, since it was at the time the family homestead. He was active in church organizations and gave money to public organizations including libraries and museums. He donated to the town of Hadley money for construction of the Goodwin Memorial library.

Family 
Dwight was married two times. His first marriage was January 13, 1841, to Nancy Shaw, daughter of Captain Metcalf Everett of Foxborough, Massachusetts. They had two sons (Melatiah, John) and three daughters (Anna, Marion, Clara). Dwight's first wife died in 1892 and he then remarried in 1894 to Clara (Leigh) Freeborn of St. Louis, Missouri. She died in 1900.

Later life and death 

Beginning in 1868, Dwight lived in Harlem and spent each summer at a property he owned on the summit of Mount Holyoke, Massachusetts. He returned from his summer resort to New York City in the fall of 1903 to attend to his business. In the first week of November he became ill from a stroke of paralysis that left him incapacitated. He died at his home on Mount Morris Park West on November 25. He was 84 years old. At the time of his death two daughters and two sons were still living. Dwight's will revealed that his estate was worth $1,000,000 that was specified to be divided proportionally between his children and grandchildren.

References

Sources

External links 

Arm & Hammer Homepage

1819 births
1903 deaths
People from South Hadley, Massachusetts
Businesspeople from Massachusetts
19th-century American businesspeople